Zornitsa may refer to:

Zornitsa, Blagoevgrad Province
Zornitsa, Burgas Province
Zornitsa, Haskovo Province
Zornitsa, Kardzhali Province
Zornitsa, Varna Province
Zornitsa Cove